Symmetrics Professional Cycling Team was a Canadian UCI Continental cycling team, active until 2008, focusing on road bicycle racing and title sponsored by Symmetrics, a Canadian-based computer software company. The team is owned by brothers Kevin and Mark Cunningham with assistance from directeur sportif Kevin Field. The Cunninghams are entrepreneurs, owners of multiple businesses and lead sponsors of the team with their respective companies Westlam and Symmetrics. The team won the 2007 UCI America Tour teams classification, while team member Svein Tuft won the UCI America Tour Individual Classification.

2008 roster
As of June 20, 2008.

Major wins

2008

Pan American Road and Track Championships (Montevideo, Uruguay)
 1st, 2008 Pan American Road and Track Championships, Individual Time Trial (Svein Tuft)
 1st, 2008 Pan American Road and Track Championships, Madison (Zach Bell, Svein Tuftt)
 1st, 2008 Pan American Road and Track Championships, Points Race (Svein Tuft)
 1st, 2008 Pan American Road and Track Championships, Individual Pursuit (Svein Tuft)

Canadian national championships
 1st, Canadian Championships - Elite Road Race (Christian Meier)
 1st, Canadian Championships - Time Trial (Svein Tuft)
 1st, Individual Pursuit - Track Championships (Svein Tuft)
 1st, Points Race - Track Championships (Zach Bell)

Other Major 2008 Results
 1st, Prologue Mad River Glen Green Mountain Stage Race (Andrew Randell)
 1st, Stage 4 Tour de la Guadeloupe (Cameron Evans)
 1st, in Stages 1 and 2 Tour de White Rock (Andrew Pinfold)
 1st, Giro di Burnaby (Andrew Pinfold)
 1st, Tour of Gastown (Andrew Pinfold)
 1st, Overall GC Tour de Delta (Zach Bell)
 1st, in stages 1,2 and 3 Tour de Delta (Svein Tuft, Cameron Evans, Andrew Pinfold)
 1st, Elkhorn Stage Race (Will Routley)
 1st, Stage 4 Tour de Nez (Eric Wohlberg)
 1st, Premier etape Mardis Cycliste de Lachine, Montreal Canada (Zach Bell)
 1st, 2008 Tour de Beauce Overall, Canada (Svein Tuft)
 1st, stage 4A Tour de Beauce, St. Georges Canada (Svein Tuft)
 1st, 2008 Westside Classic Road Race, Vancouver Canada (Cameron Evans)
 1st, St. Lawrence Market Criterium, Toronto Canada (Andrew Pinfold)
 1st, 2008 MERCO Classic Road Race, California (Eric Wohlberg)
 1st, 2008 San Dimas Stage Race, California (Cameron Evans)
 1st, stage 5 2008 Mount Hood Classic Stage Race (Andrew Pinfold)

2007
 1st, 2007 UCI America Tour, Individual (Svein Tuft)
 1st,  2007 UCI America Tour, Team
 1st, 2007 US Open, Richmond Virginia (Svein Tuft)
 1st, 2007 Vuelta a Cuba (Svein Tuft)
 1st, 2007 Canadian Championships, Road Race (Cameron Evans)
 1st, 2007 Canadian Championships, Espoir Road Race (Christian Meier)

References

External links

Cycling teams based in Canada
Defunct cycling teams based in Canada
Cycling teams established in 2005
Cycling teams disestablished in 2007